Bertram Clifford Cooley (1874 – 17 August 1935) was a South African cricketer who played first-class cricket for Natal from 1894 to 1907.

Cooley was a hard-hitting but inconsistent batsman and a useful bowler. He toured England with the South African team in 1901, scoring 126 not out batting at number nine against Cambridge University, but achieving little in the other matches. Batting at number ten in his final first-class innings, in the 1906-07 Currie Cup against Western Province, he went to the wicket with Natal's score at 100 for 8, then made 113, adding 217 for the ninth wicket with Dave Nourse; Natal won by 165 runs.

References

External links

1874 births
1935 deaths
South African cricketers
KwaZulu-Natal cricketers
Cricketers from Durban